Geely Auto is the primary car marque of Chinese group Geely. Listed as Geely Automobile Holdings Ltd. on the Hong Kong Stock Exchange and controlled through holdings in Zhejiang Geely Holding Group, Geely Auto is ZGH's mainstream brand primarily sold in China and select overseas markets.

Geely Auto is the group's original brand. Geely Auto products are divided into three eras from 1.0 era (1997-2007), 2.0 era (2007-2014), 3.0 era (2014–present). Before the current 3.0 era, Geely Auto products were also sold under different brands, including Emgrand, Englon, Gleagle, and Shanghai Maple. After entering the 3.0 era, all other brands were discontinued and their products consolidated under the Geely Auto brand.

Geely cars are manufactured using a modular architecture platform, denoted by the acronyms CMA, BMA, NL, FE, and KC.

Products

Current 

 CMA（中国星）series
 2019 – Geely Xingyue (星越 Xingyue) Fastback compact crossover CMA
 2021 – Geely Xingyue L (星越L Xingyue L) compact crossover CMA
 2020 - Geely Xingrui (星瑞 Xingrui) C-segment sedan CMA
 New model series
 2019 – Geely Jiaji (嘉际 Jiaji) MPV
 2020 – Geely Icon Subcompact crossover BMA
 2020 - Geely Haoyue (豪越 Haoyue) midsize crossover SUV
 Emgrand (帝豪 Dihao) series
 2021 - Emgrand S compact crossover
 2021 – New Emgrand (全新帝豪 Xin Dihao) Compact sedan BMA
 2022 - Emgrand L Compact sedan 
 Bo（博系） series
 2016 – Geely Boyue (博越 Boyue) / 2020 – Geely Boyue Pro compact crossover
 2022 – Geely Boyue L  (博越L Boyue L) Compact SUV CMA
 2018 – Geely Borui GE (博瑞 Borui GE) D-segment sedan
 Bin（缤系） series
 2018 – Geely Binyue (缤越 Binyue) Subcompact crossover BMA
 2018 – Geely Binrui (缤瑞 Binrui) C-segment sedan BMA
 Vision (远景 Yuanjing) series
 2018 – Geely Vision (远景 Yuanjing FC3) Compact sedan
 2016 – Vision X6 (远景 Yuanjing X6 SUV) Compact crossover
 2017 – Vision X3 (远景 Yuanjing X3) Subcompact crossover

Geely brands
1997 establishments in China
Automotive industry in China
Industry in China